Percival Thomas Harris (5 June 1927 – 27 September 2006), also known by the nickname of "Bomber", was a Welsh rugby union and World Cup winning professional rugby league footballer who played in the 1950s and 1960s, and coached rugby league in the 1960s and 1970s.

Background
Harris was born in Crumlin, in Monmouthshire, and he died aged 79 in York, North Yorkshire, England.

Playing career
In 1949 four players left the Newbridge club to play professional rugby league football in the 1949–50 Northern Rugby Football League season: Harris and Bill Hopkins to Hull FC, Granville James to Hunslet and Glyn Meredith to Wakefield Trinity. He went on to gain selection to play international matches for Wales as well. Harris was selected to play for Great Britain in the inaugural Rugby League World Cup, the 1954 tournament.

Harris played  in Hull FC's 13-30 defeat by Wigan in the 1959 Challenge Cup Final during the 1958–59 season at Wembley Stadium, London on Saturday 9 May 1959, in front of a crowd of 79,811, and played , and was man of the match winning the Lance Todd Trophy in the 5-38 defeat by Wakefield Trinity in the 1959–60 Challenge Cup Final during the 1959–60 season at Wembley Stadium, London on Saturday 14 May 1960, in front of a crowd of 79,773.

During the 1959–60 season the Australian national team toured Europe, and Harris was selected play for Great Britain against them. Harris played  in Hull FC's 14-15 defeat by Featherstone Rovers in the 1959 Yorkshire County Cup Final during at Headingley Rugby Stadium, Leeds on Saturday 31 October 1959, in front of a crowd of 23,983. Later Harris played for Great Britain in the 1960 World Cup.

Harris played over 400 games for Hull FC, in the position of hooker, up to his retirement in 1962, when he became a coach of York.

Coaching career
Harris coached the York club for 11 years, and was also a director of York Rugby League Football Club from 1966 until 1987.

References

External links
!Great Britain Statistics at englandrl.co.uk (statistics currently missing due to not having appeared for both Great Britain, and England)
(archived by web.archive.org) Tommy Harris at wales.rleague.com
(archived by web.archive.org) Wales Rugby League Hall of Fame
U.K. League Hooker in Doubt

1927 births
2006 deaths
Footballers who switched code
Great Britain national rugby league team players
Hull F.C. players
Lance Todd Trophy winners
Newbridge RFC players
Rugby union players from Monmouthshire
Rugby league players from Monmouthshire
Rugby league hookers
Rugby league players from Caerphilly County Borough
Rugby union players from Crumlin
Wales national rugby league team players
Welsh rugby league coaches
Welsh rugby league players
Welsh rugby union players
York Wasps coaches
York Wasps players